Asgarov, Asgerov or Askerov is an Azerbaijani male surname, its feminine counterpart is Asgarova, Asgerova or Askerova. It may refer to:

Azad Asgarov (born 1971), Azerbaijani mixed martial artist 
Bahram Askerov (1933–2014), Azerbaijani physicist
Dzhabar Askerov (born 1986), Russian kickboxer
Elman Asgarov (born 1975), Azerbaijani freestyle wrestler
Rafig Asgarov (born 1949), Commander of Azerbaijani Naval Forces
Salatyn Asgarova (1961–1991), Azerbaijani journalist 
Shaig Asgarov (born 1966), Azerbaijan academic
Shamil Asgarov (1929–2005), Kurdish scholar, poet, and researcher
Toghrul Asgarov (born 1992), Azerbaijani wrestler
Vugar Asgarov (born 1985), Azerbaijani football striker 
Ziyafat Asgarov (born 1963), Azerbaijani politician 

Azerbaijani-language surnames